Johannes Adrianus "Jan" Janssen (born 19 May 1940) is a Dutch former professional cyclist (1962–1972). He was world champion and winner of the Tour de France and the Vuelta a España, the first Dutch rider to win either. He rode the Tour de France eight times and finished all but the first time. He won seven stages and wore the yellow jersey for two days (after stage 16 in 1966 and after stage 22B in 1968). He was easily spotted in the peloton because of his blond hair and his glasses.

Early life
Janssen was born at Nootdorp, a small town near The Hague and Delft, just five days after the Netherlands surrendered to the Nazis. He later moved to Putte, a village on the Belgian border between Roosendaal and Antwerp. He worked with his parents as a youth, digging the heavy ground of the western Netherlands to excavate foundations for the buildings the family firm erected. He joined the cycling club at Delft when he was 16 and as a novice won 25 races in two years.

Career
Janssen turned professional after an amateur career in which he won several Dutch classics and rode for the Netherlands in the Tour de l'Avenir, which was then open to amateurs and to independents, or semi-professionals. Janssen rode for French teams and is especially associated with Pelforth-BP, sponsored by a brewer and an oil company. His talent, authority, and command of French quickly established him as the team leader.
At first he had a reputation as a sprinter but he quickly developed into a rider of multi-day races.

He competed in the individual road race at the 1960 Summer Olympics.

He rode his first Tour de France in 1963, when he won a stage, but a crash forced him to retire. In 1964 he won Paris–Nice, then two stages and the green jersey of points leader in the Tour. Later that year he became world champion at Sallanches, in France. He wore the green jersey again in the Tour of 1965 and in 1966 came close to winning overall. But it was finally in 1968 that he became the first Dutchman to win the Tour de France, beating the Belgian,  Herman Van Springel, by 38 seconds. That remained the smallest winning margin until 1989, when Greg LeMond won by only eight seconds ahead of Laurent Fignon. Janssen had not worn the yellow jersey as leader of the general classification in 1968 until he reached Paris at the end of the final stage, an individual time-trial.

The Tour in 1968 was, like the previous year, for national teams rather than trade teams. The organisers resolved to "experiment" with national teams in a measure widely interpreted as revenge by the organiser, Félix Lévitan, on sponsors he thought had provoked a strike against drug tests the previous year. Putting into one team riders who the rest of the year rode for rival sponsors proved a problem and internal rivalries were said to divide the Dutch team more than most. Janssen had to overcome these internal problems to win. His victory in the orange jersey of the Netherlands rather than the blue, yellow and white of the Pelforth  team made his first win for the Netherlands all the more popular at home.

Retirement

He retired from racing, he says, after being left behind in the Tour of Luxembourg and being ashamed to hear his name listed on the race radio service among other also-rans.

"I knew then that I was Jan Janssen, winner of the Tour de France and the championship of the world and that it was time for me to stop", he says.

He left the peloton to run a bicycle frame-building business in the south-western village of Putte, which is divided by the border with Belgium. That company still bears his name today. His neighbours there included another world champion, Hennie Kuiper. Janssen continued to ride his bike in retirement as a member of the Zuid-West Hoek club. He continues to make personal appearances along with other Dutch riders of his era. He said he enjoyed being recognised while on training rides.

Personality
The Dutch race organiser Charles Ruys, who called Janssen a businesslike, honest and straightforward man, said:

Anybody who tries to do something unpleasant to Jan, may it be in a race or a matter of money, has a very tough opponent. Like most successful bikies, Jan knows the value of money. So much so that he gives the impression that he is our Minister of Finance.

A bit of insight into his personality, showing the respect and compassion he showed for his fellow riders, can be gathered from a 2007 interview regarding the feisty British rider Tom Simpson. (See the Death of Tom Simpson):

"Occasionally Tommy could be annoying. When it was rolling along at 30kmh and - paf!… he’d attack. Oh leave us alone! There's still 150km to go pipe down. But often, he wanted war.” Janssen went on to say, “Even in the feed zones. It's not the law, but it's not polite. Musettes (lunch bags) were up in the air there was panic and crashes. It was Simpson acting like a jerk. It didn't happen often. Occasionally I was angry at him. I’d say to him in his native English: You fucking cunt... There were often many teams, five or six, in the same hotel together every evening. Each had their own table. And at a certain moment, Tommy walked into the restaurant like a gentleman, with a cane, bowler hat and in costume… He was like a Lord in England and the rest of us were in tracksuits. Everyone saw that, laughed, and the things he had done during the race were forgotten.”

Views of modern racing
Janssen spent most of his career with a French sponsor, profiting from the higher rate that the French franc enjoyed then against the guilder. But since then things have changed, he said.

We had to be good all the time, from the first of February until the end of October. Because it was my duty to make the most of my sponsor's name, to get publicity. And if you had an off-day, well, you were letting your sponsors down. Now the whole sponsorship of sport has taken off. It has become so interesting to a company, because a company that wants to get its name known, you can buy a good team, with good management, good public relations, and you can get all the big names. I think, too, that the motivation has changed with the professionals as well. You get riders like Steven Rooks and Gert-Jan Theunisse saying that after the Tour they are stopping at home because they can't be bothered with criteriums, and that's not attractive for the public.

Career achievements

Major results

1961
 1st Stage 13 Tour de l'Avenir
1962
 1st Züri-Metzgete
 3rd Overall Tour de l'Avenir
1st Stage 1, 4 & 7
 3rd Overall Olympia's Tour
1st Stage 4
1963
 1st Stage 2b (TTT) Tour de France
 1st Stage 7 Tour de France
 2nd Overall Grand Prix du Midi Libre
1st Stage 3 & 5
1964
 1st  UCI World Road Race Championships
 Tour de France
1st  Points classification
1st Stage 7 & 10a
 1st  Overall Paris–Nice
1965
 1st  Points classification Tour de France 
1st Stage 12
 1st Overall Ronde van Nederland
1st Stage 3
 1st Stage 7a Critérium du Dauphiné
 1st Stage 1 Grand Prix du Midi Libre
 1st Stage 4a Tour du Sud-Est
 1st Grand Prix du Parisien
1966
 1st Bordeaux–Paris
 1st Brabantse Pijl
1967
 1st Overall Super Prestige Pernod
 1st  Overall Vuelta a España
1st  Points classification
1st Stage 1b
 5th Overall Tour de France
1st  Points classification 
1st Stage 13
 1st Paris–Roubaix
1968
 1st  Overall Tour de France
1st Stage 14 & 22b
 6th Overall Vuelta a España
1st  Points classification
1st Stage 1a & 1b
 1st Stage 5 Paris–Nice
 1st Stage 5 Vuelta a Mallorca
1969
 1st Overall Vuelta a Mallorca
1st Stage 2
 1st Stage 2 Critérium du Dauphiné
 1st Stage 5 Paris–Nice
 1st Grand Prix d'Isbergues
1970
 1st Stage 6 Paris–Nice
 1st Stage 3a Vuelta Ciclista al País Vasco
 1st Stage 2 Grand Prix du Midi Libre
1972
 1st Stage 2 Tour de Luxembourg

Grand Tour results timeline

See also
 List of Dutch Olympic cyclists
 List of Dutch cyclists who have led the Tour de France general classification

References

External links 

 www.janjanssen.nl

1940 births
Living people
Dutch male cyclists
Tour de France winners
Vuelta a España winners
Dutch Tour de France stage winners
UCI Road World Champions (elite men)
Dutch Vuelta a España stage winners
People from Pijnacker-Nootdorp
Olympic cyclists of the Netherlands
Cyclists at the 1960 Summer Olympics
UCI Road World Championships cyclists for the Netherlands
Cyclists from South Holland
Super Prestige Pernod winners
20th-century Dutch people
21st-century Dutch people